Ride with Funkmaster Flex (Sometimes referred to as FMF) is a television show that was produced by MTV Networks. The show aired from 2003–2004, lasting two seasons. It was originally shown on Spike TV and RedMoxie and was also broadcast on MuchMusic and ESPN with a licensing agreement to MTV Networks.

Format
The show was owned and executive produced by Lashan Browning and Monica Taylor, hosted by hip-hop DJ and car enthusiast Funkmaster Flex. The program documents the subculture of automobiles that are popular in the hip-hop and Hollywood communities. In each episode, host Funkmaster Flex shows viewers automobiles owned by well-known celebrities, and goes on test-drives with them.

Celebrities
Ride with Funkmaster Flex follows a similar format as Cribs, but with cars. Celebrities featured include Eminem, Donovan McNabb, Queen Latifah, 50 Cent, Ja Rule, Lil' Kim, Ludacris, Dave Chappelle, Gene Simmons, Ashanti, Wyclef Jean, Moby, Dave Navarro, Travis Barker and Mariah Carey.

Flex also travels to America's biggest car shows to document the latest innovations in automotive technology, and tries out new hydraulic systems, rims, engines, and other high-valued accessories. Flex and his team of car experts explain to viewers how they can customize their own rides and keep up with the latest trends in car customization.

In its first season on Spike TV, Ride with Funkmaster Flex was a hit with the network's target demographics. The series drew 150% more viewers who were male 18-34 and 100% more male 18-49 compared to the timeslot the previous year on Spike TV. It was also the first hip-hop influenced urban automotive reality show that paved the way and set the standard for shows such as Pimp My Ride,  Rides,  The Kustomizer, Unique Whips, King of Cars, Street Customs, Automotive Rhythms, Fast Machines with Funkmaster Flex, Unique Autosports: Miami among others.

Similar Shows
American Hot Rod
American Chopper
American Chopper: Senior vs. Junior
Rides
Pimp My Ride
The Kustomizer
Unique Autosports: Miami
Unique Whips
King of Cars
Street Customs
Inside West Coast Customs
Limo Bob
Fast Machines with Funkmaster Flex
Funk Flex Full Throttle
Unique Rides
The Auto Firm with Alex Vega
RMD Garage
Texas Metal

External links

Car Culture Show
RIDE WITH FUNKMASTER FLEX

MTV original programming
Automotive television series
2003 American television series debuts
2004 American television series endings
Spike (TV network) original programming